Represent is the debut studio album by American rapper Fat Joe da Gangsta. The album's lead single "Flow Joe" peaked number 82 on the Billboard Hot 100 by late 1993. In mid-1994, he released his second single "Watch the Sound" followed by "The Shit Is Real", featuring a remix by DJ Premier, which would appear on Joe's second album.

Track listing

Credits 
 Recorded at Jazzy Jay's Recording Studio
 Mixed at Powerplay by Chris Conway
 Producers: Diamond D, Lord Finesse, The Beatnuts, Showbiz, Chilly Dee
 Executive Producers: Chris Lighty and Fat Joe
 Scratches: DJ Roc Raida, DJ Rob Swift
 Mastered: Michael Sarsfield

Charts

References

1993 debut albums
Fat Joe albums
Albums produced by Diamond D
Albums produced by Lord Finesse
Albums produced by Showbiz (producer)
Albums produced by the Beatnuts
Relativity Records albums